Stefan Rakowitz (born 3 April 1990) is an Austrian professional footballer.

Club career
He started his career in 2008 playing in the Austrian Regional League with TSV Hartberg. At the end of the season, they won the Central Regionalliga. He then signed with SC Wiener Neustadt in 2012, to play in the Austrian Football Bundesliga. On 16 July 2014, he signed with SC Ritzing.

Honours
TSV Hartberg
Central Regionalliga: 2008-09

References

External links
 

1990 births
Living people
Austrian footballers
TSV Hartberg players
SC Wiener Neustadt players
SC Ritzing players
SV Horn players
FC Wacker Innsbruck (2002) players
Austrian Football Bundesliga players
2. Liga (Austria) players
Austrian Regionalliga players
Association football midfielders
People from Oberwart
Footballers from Burgenland